Chris Wang or Wang You-sheng (born 9 June 1982) is a Taiwanese actor, model, singer and writer. He previously went by the stage name Wang Yu-xiang (王郁翔). He got his start in show business when hosting the popular Taiwanese travel show The King of Adventure.

Life and career
Chris Wang is a Taiwanese actor and TV host. He attended New Taipei Municipal Yong-Ping High School. He has a degree in finance from National Central University. During college, he took a job in Australia for the summer and biked across the desert. After he returned to Taiwan, he saw the international-travel show "The King of Adventure" was looking for a new host, and recommended himself at the show's blog site. The show's producers were impressed by him and he became the show's fourth host in 2008. When Chris had first seen the show on TV a few years before, he had shouted at his friends that he wanted to host the show someday.

He started acting in TV drama series with a role in "Lucky Days: Second Time Around", 2010's "I Love You" and then "P.S. Man". His fame rose as one of the male leads on the record-setting drama, in 2010 "The Fierce Wife", and its movie sequel, 2012 "The Fierce Wife Final Episode". He followed up with leading roles in shows such as 2011's "They Are Flying", "Inborn Pair", and 2012 "Love Me or Leave Me".

Aside from winning awards for hosting The King of Adventure, his success in dramatic roles has proven him to be a rising actor with great potential and international appeal. Chris has also released a music album in 2013 and published several books.

Personal life
Wang dated and married his manager, Lin Yi-xian (林宜嫻), in 2015. They have one daughter, Wang Lei-zhen (王蕾榛), born on 9 April 2015, and a son who was born in June 2017.

Filmography

Television

Film

Music video appearances
2010 – Naive 天真 by XianZi 弦子
2011 – As the Winter Nights Become Warmer 當冬夜漸暖 by Stefanie Sun 孫燕姿
2011 – Thinking of Her When You're With Me 陪我的時候想著她 by Claire Kuo 郭靜

Discography

Studio albums

Published works
 2009 October 30 : You Are the King of Adventure: Chris's Dream Heaven (你，就是冒險王) – 
 2011 October 15 : Naked, Fake (宥勝‧裸裝) – 
 2012 December 12 : My Challenge Is Not Perfect (挑戰我的不完美) – 
 2016 : 因為妳，夢想啟動：菜鳥奶爸追夢記 –

References

External links
  Ocean Butterflies Music page
  Chris Wang Facebook page
  Chris Wang Weibo page

1982 births
Living people
Taiwanese male television actors
Male actors from Taipei
Taiwanese male film actors
Taiwanese television personalities
21st-century Taiwanese male actors
Taiwanese writers